TruthOrFiction.com (also TruthOrFiction.org) is a fact-checking website about urban legends, Internet rumors, and other questionable stories or photographs.

TruthOrFiction.com was founded by Rich Buhler, a journalist, speaker, and author who was also known as the "Father of Modern Christian Talk Radio" at KBRT.

The topics are researched by TruthOrFiction's staff, and rated "Truth" (if true), or "Fiction" (if untrue). When the accuracy is not known with certainty, the stories are rated "Unproven," "Disputed," "Reported to be Truth" or "Reported to be Fiction."  Partially true stories are rated "Truth & Fiction," "Truth But Inaccurate Details," or similar.

Main site 
TruthOrFiction has been referenced by news media and other online websites such as the Florida Times Union which said that: TruthorFiction.com was founded in 1999 by the late Rich Buhler... who researched and wrote about urban legends for more than 30 years, according to various media reports. Its staff researches the rumors; original sources are usually listed or linked, so it is a good site to corroborate facts.TruthOrFiction.com at first addressed wild claims, pictures, or stories that resurface cyclically. Some stories resurface every year, or every election year, while some suddenly re-appear after years of dormancy. However, by 2020 it was most often fact-checking claims about current events, in common with similar websites.

See also
 Fact checker
 FactCheck.org
 MythBusters
 Snopes.com
 The Straight Dope

References

External links

Internet properties established in 1999
American websites
Fact-checking websites
1999 establishments in the United States